The 2018–19 Stanbic Bank 20 Series was the eighth edition of the Stanbic Bank 20 Series, a Twenty20 cricket tournament in Zimbabwe. It took place from 11 to 17 March 2019. The tournament featured four teams, instead of the five that were scheduled to take part in the previous edition, with the Rising Stars being disbanded. There was no defending champion, as the previous edition of the tournament was cancelled.

Following the conclusion of the group stage, Mashonaland Eagles and Mid West Rhinos advanced to the third-place play-off match. Matabeleland Tuskers and Mountaineers progressed to the final. The final finished as a no result due to rain, so Matabeleland Tuskers were declared the winners, after finishing highest in the group stage of the tournament.

Points table
The following teams competed in the tournament:

 Champions

Fixtures

Round-robin

Finals

References

External links
 Series home at ESPN Cricinfo

2018 in Zimbabwean cricket
2019 in Zimbabwean cricket
Stanbic Bank 20 Series